Thomas Francis Hafey (July 12, 1913 – October 2, 1996) nicknamed "Heave-O",  was a Major League Baseball third baseman who played with the New York Giants and the St. Louis Browns in  and . His brother Bud Hafey and cousin Chick Hafey also played in the Major Leagues.

External links

1913 births
1996 deaths
Major League Baseball third basemen
Baseball players from California
New York Giants (NL) players
St. Louis Browns players
Sportspeople from Berkeley, California